The Outline was an experimental band from Los Angeles, California, formed in 2002. The group's first release was The Outline Proudly Presents the Chestnut Tree, a self-recorded EP, in 2005. The band was signed by Fearless Records in the summer of 2006. The band then recorded their full-length album You Smash It, We'll Build Around It, released on July 11, 2006. During their career they toured with Panic! at the Disco, Saosin, Vedera, Forgive Durden, Envy on the Coast, and Polysics, among others. The band self-released their follow-up "Phantasmagoria" in August 2009, followed promptly by a four-song EP of Phantasmagoria remixes, courtesy of various artists including Superhumanoids.  Their final project, the "Who You Love EP" released on June 30, 2010.  The group has since disbanded.

Band Members
Graham Fink - Guitar, Lead vocals
Austen Lee - Keyboards, Guitar, Saxophone
Max St. John - Bass, Backing vocals

Discography
The Outline Proudly Presents the Chestnut Tree (2005)
You Smash It, We'll Build Around It (2006)
Phantasmagoria (Aug, 2009)
"Phantasmagoria: the Remixes Vol 1" (Nov 2009)
"Who You Love EP" (2010)

Appearances
"Shotgun" was featured on the video games Burnout Revenge and Burnout Legends.
"Shotgun" was played in an episode from the show 'One Tree Hill'.
"Aesthetics" was featured in the finale of The Real World: Las Vegas.

External links
http://www.theoutline.net/
http://www.fearlessrecords.com/viewband.php?band_id=28#self
http://www.purevolume.com/theoutline
http://www.myspace.com/theoutline

Fearless Records artists
Alternative rock groups from California
Rock music groups from California
American post-hardcore musical groups